Thomas Pinney (born April 23, 1932) is an American English scholar known for his work collecting the letters of Thomas Babington Macaulay and Rudyard Kipling, as well as a wine scholar known for his two-volume history of wine in the U.S. He is an emeritus professor of English at Pomona College in Claremont, California, having previously held the Spalding Professor and William M. Keck Distinguished Service Professor endowed chair and been chair of the department.

Works

References

External links
Faculty page at Pomona College

1932 births
Living people
Pomona College faculty
Oenologists
American academics of English literature